Steven Jahn (born 15 July 1989 in Luckenwalde) is a German retired footballer.

External links 
 
 Steven Jahn at Fupa

1989 births
Living people
Sportspeople from Luckenwalde
People from Bezirk Potsdam
German footballers
Footballers from Brandenburg
Association football forwards
3. Liga players
1. FC Union Berlin players
TSG Neustrelitz players